Zamanabad (also Romanized as Zamānābād) is a village in Jowshan Rural District, Golbaf District, Kerman County, Kerman Province, Iran. At the 2006 census, its population was 149, in 32 families.

References 

Populated places in Kerman County